The Classic Christmas Album is a compilation album of holiday music by American vocalist Barbra Streisand. It was initially released on September 27, 2013, through Legacy Recordings and Sony Music Entertainment, with a revised version released digitally a few months later and physically on October 7, 2014. The collection was produced by Didier C. Deutsch, Jeffrey James, and Tim Sturges. All of the material on the record is taken from Streisand's previous two Christmas albums, A Christmas Album (1967) and Christmas Memories (2001).

Responding positively to the compilation, critics from AllMusic rated both versions of The Classic Christmas Album 3.5 out of 5 stars. It was greeted by moderate success, peaking at number 95 on the Billboard 200 and at number two on the Top Holiday Albums component chart. It also charted in the Czech Republic at number 93.

Creation and release 
The Classic Christmas Album is a collection of previously distributed material from Streisand's music catalog. Album label Legacy Recordings announced that they would release Christmas collection albums from several musicians, including Streisand, Frank Sinatra, Johnny Mathis, Perry Como, and Il Divo. The compilation was produced by Didier C. Deutsch, Jeffrey James, and Tim Sturges, while Streisand, Mike Berniker, Robbie Buchanan, Jack Gold, William Ross, and Ettore Stratta were credited as the producers of the album's original recordings. The 2013 digital edition features different photography compared to the original release, in addition to a new overall sequence; this version was also released as a CD on October 7, 2014, by Legacy and Columbia Records.

Streisand had originally recorded album songs "Have Yourself a Merry Little Christmas", "The Christmas Song (Chestnuts Roasting on an Open Fire)", "The Best Gift", "I Wonder as I Wander", "Sleep in Heavenly Peace (Silent Night)",  "Jingle Bells?", "My Favorite Things", "O Little Town of Bethlehem", "White Christmas", "Gounod's Ave Maria", and "The Lord's Prayer" for her 1967 Christmas album, A Christmas Album. Furthermore, "I'll Be Home for Christmas", "A Christmas Love Song", "It Must Have Been the Mistletoe", "I Remember", "Snowbound", "Christmas Lullaby", "Christmas Mem'ries", "What Are You Doing New Year's Eve?", "Ave Maria Op. 52 No. 6", and "One God" were taken from her 2001 album, Christmas Memories.

Critical reception 

Regarding the 2013 standard release, AllMusic's Steve Leggett awarded The Classic Christmas Album 3.5 out of 5 stars, even though he noted how simple it is to create a holiday album within a small amount of time. For the 2013 digital version and 2014 physical release, Stephen Thomas Erlewine from the same publication gave the same rating and wrote: "this holds together well because it's impeccably arranged, produced and performed and, as it contains the bulk of each holiday record from Barbra, it's a nice bargain to boot."

Commercial performance 
In the United States, the album debuted at number 150 on the Billboard 200 chart for the week ending November 30, 2013. The following publication revealed it dropped to number 152 and the week after that it moved to number 193. However, on December 21 of the same year, The Classic Christmas Album rose and peaked at number 95 on the list, increasing its position by 98 places. It spent an additional two weeks on the publication's list before dropping off the chart completely. In addition to its time spent on the Billboard 200, it was reported that the record was number 75 on the Top Current Albums component chart, which ranks the best-selling albums of the week in the United States. For the Holiday Albums chart, the album debuted and peaked at number 2, blocked from the top spot by the compilation album Now That's What I Call Christmas! (2001).

During the following holiday season in 2014, the record debuted on the Top Catalog Albums component chart, where it peaked at number 28 for the week ending January 3, 2015. The Classic Christmas Album also re-entered several charts. It was at number 159 on the Billboard 200, reappearing along with Streisand's 1967 Christmas album, A Christmas Album, which was currently at number 194. To date, her record has spent 11 weeks on the chart. Outside of North America, it peaked at number 93 in the Czech Republic.

Track listing

Charts

References

External links 
 

2013 Christmas albums
2013 compilation albums
Barbra Streisand compilation albums
Christmas albums by American artists
Christmas compilation albums
Legacy Recordings compilation albums
Pop Christmas albums
Sony Music Christmas albums
Streisand, Barbra